Lawrence Eugene Evans (born July 11, 1953) is a former linebacker of the Denver Broncos. He played for the Broncos from 1976 to 1982.  He was drafted by the Denver Broncos in the 14th round (#390) in the 1976 draft. He played for the Broncos during their run to Super Bowl XII. During his career he picked off three passes and recovered four fumbles.  He currently resides in a suburb of Denver, Colorado.

References

1953 births
Living people
Sportspeople from Biloxi, Mississippi
American football linebackers
Biloxi High School alumni
Denver Broncos players
San Diego Chargers players
Mississippi College Choctaws football players